Frausto is a surname. Notable people with the surname include:

Alejandra Frausto Guerrero, Mexican cultural director
Alfredo Frausto (born 1983), Mexican footballer
Antonio R. Frausto (1897–1954), Mexican actor
Federico Bernal Frausto (born 1953), Mexican politician
João J. R. Fraústo da Silva (1933-2022), Portuguese chemist
Salomon Frausto, American architectural theorist
Stephanie Frausto (born 1990), American mixed martial artist
Zoila Frausto Gurgel (born 1983), American mixed martial artist